The Derwent flounder (Taratretis derwentensis) is a flatfish of the family Pleuronectidae. Its native habitat is the south-western Pacific, particularly the south-east coast of Australia, from New South Wales to South Australia and Tasmania.

Commercial fishing

Although the Derwent flounder is listed as a minor component of the Tasmanian commercial flounder catch, its small size makes it undesirable, and any bycatch would probably be discarded. It is also recorded as bycatch in prawn trawling in South Australia.

References

Derwent flounder
River Derwent (Tasmania)
Vertebrates of Tasmania
Derwent flounder